Ezhu Muthal Onpathu Vare is a 1985 Indian Malayalam-language film directed by J. Sasikumar and produced by P. K. R. Pillai. The film stars Mohanlal, Ratheesh, Captain Raju, and Anuradha. The film features musical score by K. J. Joy.

Cast 
Mohanlal
Ratheesh
M.G.Soman
K.P.Ummer
Captain Raju
T.G.Ravi
Jagathy SreeKumar
Bhagyalakshmi (actress)
Chithra
Anuradha

Soundtrack 
The music was composed by K. J. Joy and the lyrics were written by Cheramangalam and Poovachal Khader.

References

External links 
 

1985 films
1980s Malayalam-language films